The income tax threshold is the income level at which a person begins paying income taxes. The income tax threshold equates to the:

Personal allowance in the UK, which is £12,500 for 2019/20.
Basic allowance in Germany, which is €9,408 in 2020.
Income tax threshold in France, which was €6,088 in 2012.
The standard deduction in the US, which was $12,000 in 2018 for a single person.
Basic personal amount in Canada, which was C$11,809 in 2018.
Tax-free threshold in Australia, which was A$18,200 in 2012-13.
Tax-free threshold in Greece, which was €9,545 in 2016. 
Tax-free threshold in Poland is 30000 PLN in 2022.

See also
Basic income guarantee
Tax bracket
Taxable income

References

threshold